Yitzhak Shamir (born Yitzhak Yezernitsky; October 22, 1915 – June 30, 2012) was an Israeli politician and the seventh Prime Minister of Israel, serving two terms, 1983–1984 and 1986–1992. Before the establishment of the State of Israel, Shamir was a leader of the Zionist paramilitary and terrorist organization Lehi. After the establishment of the Israeli state he served in the Mossad between 1955 and 1965 and as a Knesset member. He served as the sixth Speaker of the Knesset, and as foreign affairs minister. Shamir was the country's third-longest-serving prime minister, after Benjamin Netanyahu and David Ben-Gurion.

Early and personal life
Yitzhak Yezernitsky (later Yitzhak Shamir) was born in the predominantly Jewish village of Ruzhany, Grodno province, Russian Empire (now Belarus), which after World War I returned to Poland, as the son of Perla and Shlomo, owner of a leather factory. Shamir later moved to Białystok and studied at a Hebrew high school network. As a youth, he joined Betar, the Revisionist Zionist youth movement. He studied law at the University of Warsaw, but cut his studies short in order to emigrate to what was then Mandatory Palestine. 

His parents and two sisters were murdered in the Holocaust. Shamir claimed his father was killed just outside his birthplace in Ruzhany by villagers who had been his childhood friends after he had escaped from a German train transporting Jews to the death camps, though this was never confirmed. His mother and a sister were murdered in the concentration camps, and another sister was shot dead. Shamir once told Ehud Olmert that when his father, living under Nazi occupation, had been informed that the extermination of the Jews was imminent, his father had replied that "I have a son in the Land of Israel, and he will exact my revenge on them". According to an obituary, he had dreamed of living in the Land of Israel since he was a boy, and felt immediately at home when he moved there. In 1935, Shamir immigrated to Palestine, where he worked in an accountant's office. He later adopted as his surname the name he used on a forged underground identity card, Shamir. He told his wife this was because Shamir means a thorn that stabs and a rock that can cut steel. In 1944 he married Shulamit, whom he met in a detention camp where she was incarcerated after the ship on which she sailed to Mandate Palestine from Bulgaria in 1941 was declared illegal. They had two children, Yair and Gilada. Shulamit died on July 29, 2011.

Zionist activism

Shamir joined the Irgun Zvai Leumi, a Zionist paramilitary group that opposed British control of Palestine.  When the Irgun split in 1940, Shamir joined the more militant faction Lehi, also known as the Stern Gang, headed by Avraham Stern. He was imprisoned by British authorities in 1941. A few months after Stern was killed by the British in 1942, Shamir and Eliyahu Giladi hid under a stack of mattresses in a warehouse of the detention camp at Mazra'a, and at night escaped through the barbed wire fences of the camp. Shamir, together with Giladi, Anshell Shpillman and Yehoshua Cohen, reorganized the movement into cells and trained its members. In his memoirs, Shamir admitted in 1994 what had long been suspected: that the killing of Giladi in 1943 was ordered by Shamir himself, allegedly due to Giladi advocating the assassination of David Ben-Gurion, and arguing for other violence deemed too extremist by fellow Stern members.

In 1943, he became one of the three leaders of the group, serving with Nathan Yellin-Mor and Israel Eldad.  Shamir sought to emulate the anti-British struggle of the Irish Republicans and took the nickname "Michael" after Irish Republican leader Michael Collins. Shamir plotted the 1944 assassination of Lord Moyne, British Minister for Middle East Affairs, and personally selected Eliyahu Hakim and Eliyahu Bet-Zuri to carry it out. Moyne had been targeted due to his perceived role as an architect of British restrictions on Jewish immigration to Palestine, and in particular, the Patria disaster, which was blamed on him.

In July 1946, Shamir was arrested. He had been walking in public in disguise and a British police sergeant, T.G. Martin, recognized him by his bushy eyebrows. Arrested, he was exiled to Africa, and interned in Eritrea by British Mandatory authorities. Lehi members subsequently tracked down and killed Martin in September 1946. On January 14, 1947, Shamir and four Irgun members escaped the Sembel Prison (a British Detention Camp) through a tunnel they had dug, 200 feet in length, and Mayer Malka of Khartoum subsequently arranged for them to be hidden in an oil truck for three days as it was driven over the border to French Somaliland. They were re-arrested by the French authorities, but Shamir with Malka's assistance was eventually allowed passage to France and granted political asylum. Lehi sent him a forged passport, with which he entered Israel after the Israeli Declaration of Independence in 1948.

During the 1948 Arab–Israeli War, most of Lehi's members joined the newly formed Israel Defense Forces. Lehi formally disbanded on May 29, 1948. However, the Lehi group in Jerusalem continued to function independently, outside government control. During a UN-imposed truce, Shamir, Eldad, and Yellin-Mor authorized the assassination of the United Nations representative in the Middle East, Count Folke Bernadotte, who was killed in September 1948, when Lehi gunmen ambushed his motorcade in Jerusalem. Lehi had feared that Israel would agree to Bernadotte's peace proposals, which they considered disastrous, unaware that the provisional Israeli government had already rejected a proposal by Bernadotte the day before. The Israeli provisional government drafted an ordinance for the prevention of terrorism and then invoked it to declare Lehi a terrorist organisation, consequently rounding up 200 of its members for "administrative detention" (prison). They were granted amnesty some months later and given a state pardon.

Mossad
In the first years of Israel's independence, Shamir managed several commercial enterprises. In 1955, he joined the Mossad, serving until 1965. During his Mossad career, he directed Operation Damocles, the assassinations of German rocket scientists working on the Egyptian missile programme.

He ran a unit that placed agents in hostile countries, created the Mossad's division for planning and served on its General Staff.

Shamir resigned from the Mossad in protest over the treatment of Mossad Director-General Isser Harel, who had been compelled to resign after Prime Minister David Ben-Gurion ordered an end to Operation Damocles.

Political career

In 1969, Shamir joined the Herut party headed by Menachem Begin and was first elected to the Knesset in 1973 as a member of the Likud. He became Speaker of the Knesset in 1977, and Foreign Minister in 1980 which he remained until 1986, concurrently serving as prime minister from October 1983 to September 1984 after Begin's resignation.

Prime Minister
Shamir had a reputation as a Likud hard-liner. In 1977 he presided at the Knesset visit of Egyptian President Anwar Sadat. He abstained in the Knesset votes to approve the Camp David Accords and the Peace Treaty with Egypt. In 1981 and 1982, as Foreign Minister, he guided negotiations with Egypt to normalize relations after the treaty. Following the 1982 Lebanon War he directed negotiations which led to the May 17, 1983 Agreement with Lebanon, which did not materialize.

Shamir won reelection as party leader in the 1984 Herut leadership election, defeating a challenge from Ariel Sharon.

His failure to stabilize Israel's inflationary economy and to suggest a solution to the quagmire of Lebanon led to an indecisive election in 1984, after which a national unity government was formed between his Likud party and the Alignment led by Shimon Peres. As part of the agreement, Peres held the post of Prime Minister until September 1986, when Shamir took over.

As he prepared to reclaim the office of prime minister, Shamir's hard-line image appeared to moderate. However, Shamir remained reluctant to change the status quo in Israel's relations with its Arab neighbours and blocked Peres's initiative to promote a regional peace conference as agreed in 1987 with King Hussein of Jordan in what has become known as the London Agreement. Re-elected in 1988, Shamir and Peres formed a new coalition government until "the dirty trick" of 1990, when the Alignment left the government, leaving Shamir with a narrow right-wing coalition. During this period the Palestinians in the West Bank and Gaza Strip launched the first Intifada, which was suppressed with force by the Israeli government.

Shamir urged the US government to stop granting refugee visas to Soviet Jews, persuading it that they were not refugees because they already had a homeland in Israel and were only moving to the United States for economic reasons. He also termed the emigration of Soviet Jews to the United States rather than to Israel "defection", and called the issuing of US refugee visas to Soviet Jews when Israel was already willing to take them in "an insult to Israel". In 1989, a wave of Jewish emigration began from the Soviet Union after the Soviets allowed their Jewish population to emigrate freely. In October of that year, the US agreed to his requests and stopped issuing refugee visas to Soviet emigrants. Subsequently, Israel became the main destination of Soviet Jewish emigrants. Over one million Soviet immigrants would subsequently arrive in Israel, many of whom would have likely gone to the United States had Shamir not pressed the US government to change its policy.

During the Gulf War, Iraq fired Scud missiles at Israel, many of which struck population centers. Iraq hoped to provoke Israeli retaliation and thus alienate Arab members of the United States-assembled coalition against Iraq. Shamir deployed Israeli Air Force jets to patrol the northern airspace with Iraq. However, after the United States and the Netherlands deployed Patriot antimissile batteries to protect Israel, and US and British special forces began hunting for Scuds, Shamir responded to American calls for restraint, recalled the jets, and agreed not to retaliate.

During his term, Shamir reestablished diplomatic relations between Israel and several dozen African, Asian and other countries. In May 1991, as the Ethiopian government of Mengistu Haile Mariam was collapsing, Shamir ordered the airlifting of 14,000 Ethiopian Jews, known as Operation Solomon.  He continued his efforts, begun in the late 1960s, to bring Soviet Jewish refugees to Israel.  Shamir restored diplomatic relations between the Soviet Union and Israel in October 1991, and following its dissolution, established relations between Israel and his native Belarus in May 1992.  Shamir was dedicated to bringing Jews from all over the world to Israel, and called on American Jews to emigrate to Israel in spite of a higher standard of living in the US, saying that he expected even American Jewish youth to realize that "man does not live by bread alone" but to "learn and understand Jewish history, the Bible... and reach the only conclusion: to come on aliya to Israel."

Relations with the US were strained in the period after the war over the Madrid peace talks, which Shamir opposed.  As a result, US President George H. W. Bush was reluctant to approve loan guarantees to help absorb immigrants from the former Soviet Union.  Finally, Shamir gave in and in October 1991 participated in the Madrid talks.  His narrow, right-wing government collapsed, and new elections were necessarily called.

In a February 1992 leadership election, Shamir retained his leadership of Likud, defeating challenges from David Levy and Ariel Sharon.

One of Shamir's last acts as Prime Minister was to approve the 16 February 1992 assassination of the leader of Hizbullah, Sheikh Abbas al-Musawi.

Electoral defeat and retirement

Shamir was defeated by Yitzhak Rabin's Labour in the 1992 election. He stepped down from the Likud leadership in March 1993 but remained a member of the Knesset until the 1996 election. For some time, Shamir was a critic of his Likud successor, Benjamin Netanyahu, as being too indecisive in dealing with the Arabs. Shamir went so far as to resign from the Likud in 1998 and endorse Herut, a right-wing splinter movement led by Benny Begin, which later joined the National Union during the 1999 election. After Netanyahu was defeated, Shamir returned to the Likud fold and supported Ariel Sharon in the 2001 election. Subsequently, in his late eighties, Shamir ceased making public comments.

Illness and death

In 2004, Shamir's health declined, with the progression of his Alzheimer's disease, and he was moved to a nursing home. The government turned down a request by the family to finance his stay at the facility.

Shamir died on the morning of June 30, 2012, at a nursing home in Tel Aviv where he had spent the last few years as a result of the Alzheimer's disease he had suffered since the mid-1990s. He was given a state funeral, which took place on July 2 at Mount Herzl, Jerusalem, and was buried beside his wife, Shulamit, who had died the previous year. As his body was lying in state Speaker of the Knesset Reuven Rivlin laid a wreath on his coffin and said:

Shamir was buried at Mount Herzl.

Commemoration
Israeli President Shimon Peres said that "Yitzhak Shamir was a brave warrior for Israel, before and after its inception. He was a great patriot and his enormous contribution will be forever etched in our chronicles.  He was loyal to his beliefs and he served his country with the utmost dedication for decades. May he rest in peace." Prime Minister Benjamin Netanyahu's office issued a statement upon hearing of his death that read: "[Shamir] led Israel with a deep loyalty to the nation. [The Prime Minister] expresses his deep pain over the announcement of the departure of Yitzhak Shamir. He was part of a marvelous generation which created the state of Israel and struggled for the Jewish people." This was despite previous feuds between the two once-Likud members. He was also mourned in the Knesset.

Foreign Minister Avigdor Lieberman added that Shamir "contributed greatly to the foundation of the state, which he served his entire life with loyalty and unwavering dedication. He set an example in each position that he held. I had the privilege to be personally acquainted with Shamir, and I will always remember him and his great contribution to the state;" while Defense Minister Ehud Barak said: "His whole life, Shamir was as stable as granite and maintained focus without compromises.  He always strived to ensure Israel's freedom.  His devotion knew no bounds [and he] always sought what's right for the people of Israel and for the country's security."

Leader of the Opposition and Labor Party head Shelly Yachimovich offered her condolences to Shamir's family saying that "he was a determined prime minister who dedicated his life to the state. He followed his ideological path honestly and humbly, as a leader should. The citizens of Israel will always remember the wisdom he demonstrated during the First Gulf War. He showed restraint and saved Israel from undue entanglement in the Iraq War. This decision proved to be a brave and wise act of leadership."
His daughter Gilada Diamant said: [My father] belonged to a different generation of leaders, people with values and beliefs.  I hope that we have more people like him in the future. His political doing has undoubtedly left its mark on the State of Israel.  Dad was an amazing man, a family man in the fullest sense of the word, a man who dedicated himself to the State of Israel but never forgot his family, not even for a moment.  He was a special man.

Awards and recognition
In 2001, Shamir received the Israel Prize, for his lifetime achievements and special contribution to society and the State of Israel.

Published works
He wrote Sikumo shel davar, a book which was published in English by Weidenfeld and Nicolson, London, as Summing Up: An autobiography (1994).

Overview of offices held
Shamir twice served as prime minister (Israel's head of government). His first stint spanned from 10 October 1983 through 13 September 1984, leading the 20th government during the latter portion of the 10th Knesset. His second stint lasted from 20 October 1986 through 13 July 1992, leading the 22nd government government during the latter half of the 11th Knesset, and 23rd and 24th governments during the 12th Knesset.

Shamir was a member of the Knesset from after his 1973 election until 1996. During the first portion of the 13th Knesset Shamir served as the Knesset's opposition leader (at the time an unofficial and honorary role) from July 1992 through March 1993.

Shamir became leader of Herut and Likud in 1983, leading Likud until 1993.

Ministerial posts

Electoral history

Party leadership elections

See also
List of Israel Prize recipients
Not one inch

References

Bibliography

External links

 

 

|-

|-

|-

1915 births
2012 deaths
People from Pruzhany District
People from Slonimsky Uyezd
Belarusian Jews
Polish emigrants to Mandatory Palestine
Herut politicians
Irgun members
Israel Prize for special contribution to society and the State recipients
Israeli civil servants
Israeli people of Belarusian-Jewish descent
Jewish Israeli politicians
Lehi (militant group)
Likud leaders
Leaders of the Opposition (Israel)
Members of the 8th Knesset (1974–1977)
Members of the 9th Knesset (1977–1981)
Members of the 10th Knesset (1981–1984)
Members of the 11th Knesset (1984–1988)
Members of the 12th Knesset (1988–1992)
Members of the 13th Knesset (1992–1996)
Speakers of the Knesset
Prime Ministers of Israel
University of Warsaw alumni
Ministers of Environment of Israel
Ministers of Finance of Israel
Ministers of Foreign Affairs of Israel
Ministers of Internal Affairs of Israel
Burials at Mount Herzl
Deaths from dementia in Israel
Deaths from Alzheimer's disease
Betar members